Ramona Rhodes is an American geriatrician and physician.

Career 
Ramona was an associate professor of internal medicine at the University of Texas Southwestern Medical Center from 2009 to 2020. In 2020, she became the associate director for health services research for the Geriatric Research, Education, and Clinical Center of the Central Arkansas Veterans Healthcare System. She is an associate professor in the Department of Geriatrics at the University of Arkansas for Medical Sciences. Ramona currently serves on the board of directors for the American Geriatrics Society. She is also section editor for ethnogeriatrics and special populations for the Journal of the American Geriatrics Society.

Awards 

 Fellow of the American Academy of Hospice and Palliative Medicine (FAAHPM) (2017)
 American Geriatrics Society Fellow (AGSF) (2013)

References 

American geriatricians
Women geriatricians
Year of birth missing (living people)
Living people
University of Arkansas for Medical Sciences faculty